Omoplatica is a monotypic moth genus in the family Geometridae. Its only species, Omoplatica holopolia, is known from Australia. Both the genus and species were first described by Turner in 1926.

References

Oenochrominae
Monotypic moth genera